Nellita is an unincorporated community in Kitsap County, in the U.S. state of Washington.

History
A post office called Nellita was established in 1900, and remained in operation until 1924. The community was named after Nelli Brueger.

References

Unincorporated communities in Kitsap County, Washington
Unincorporated communities in Washington (state)